Kali is a presumably moribund Mbum language of northern Cameroon or the Central African Republic.

Distribution
Kali, or Kali-Dek, is found in scattered areas throughout the eastern part of Vina department (Belel commune), in the eastern part of the communes of Ngaoundéré (Vina department, Adamawa Region) and Meiganga (Mbere department, Adamawa Region), and the northern part of Lom-et-Djerem department (Garoua-Boulaï and Bétaré-Oya communes, Eastern Region). It is spoken by 7,438 speakers.

References

Roger Blench, 2004. List of Adamawa languages (ms)

Languages of Cameroon
Mbum languages